Acromyrmex evenkul is a species of leaf-cutter ant, a New World ant of the subfamily Myrmicinae of the genus Acromyrmex. This species is from one of the two genera of advanced attines (fungus-growing ants) within the tribe Attini.

Synonyms 
 Acromyrmex gallardoi Santschi, 1936
 Sericomyrmex gallardoi Santschi, 1920

See also
List of leafcutter ants

References

Insects described in 1995
Acromyrmex